is a Japanese manga series written and illustrated by Kōcha Agasawa. It was originally published as a one-shot in Shueisha's Shōnen Jump+ website in January 2021, before being serialized in the same website starting in May 2022. It has been collected into three tankōbon volumes as of March 2023.

Plot
Miyu Suzuki and Yusuke Tani are two high school students who are polar opposites of each other - Suzuki is an energetic and outgoing girl who tends to follow the crowd, even when she doesn't feel like doing so, while Tani is a quiet and introverted boy who bluntly speaks his mind. Because of this, Suzuki has grown to have a crush on Tani, but is unable to really make her feelings known to him. The series follows Suzuki and Tani in their developing relationship, as well as their friends' own issues.

Publication
Written and illustrated by Kōcha Agasawa, You and I Are Polar Opposites was initially a one-shot published on Shueisha's Shōnen Jump+ website on January 7, 2021. It began serialization in the same website on May 2, 2022. The first tankōbon volume was released on July 4, 2022. As of March 2023, three volumes have been released.

In June 2022, Shueisha began releasing the series in English on its Manga Plus website and app.

Volume list

Chapters not yet in tankōbon format
These chapters have yet to be published in a tankōbon volume.

Reception
In 2022, You and I Are Polar Opposites was nominated in the Next Manga Awards in the Web Manga category, and ranked second out of 50 nominees. It ranked 34th on the 2022 "Book of the Year" list by Da Vinci magazine. The series ranked ninth in the 2023 edition of Takarajimasha's Kono Manga ga Sugoi! list of best manga for male readers, tying with Midori no Uta: Shūshū Gunfū. The series was nominated for the 16th Manga Taishō. It also ranked twelfth in the National Bookstore Employees Recommended Comics of 2023 list.

Louis Kemner of Comic Book Resources positively compared the series to My Dress-Up Darling, noting the similarities in the lead characters' chemistry and the story's use of the "opposites attract" romantic paradigm.

References

External links
  
 

Japanese webcomics
Romantic comedy anime and manga
School life in anime and manga
Shōnen manga
Shueisha manga
Webcomics in print